

276001–276100 

|-bgcolor=#f2f2f2
| colspan=4 align=center | 
|}

276101–276200 

|-bgcolor=#f2f2f2
| colspan=4 align=center | 
|}

276201–276300 

|-bgcolor=#f2f2f2
| colspan=4 align=center | 
|}

276301–276400 

|-bgcolor=#f2f2f2
| colspan=4 align=center | 
|}

276401–276500 

|-bgcolor=#f2f2f2
| colspan=4 align=center | 
|}

276501–276600 

|-id=568
| 276568 Joestübler ||  || Johannes Stübler (born 1958), an Austrian amateur astronomer and member of the Astronomical Society of Linz, who has been involved in public outreach activities in many national and international astronomical organizations, including the IAU (Src) || 
|}

276601–276700 

|-id=681
| 276681 Loremaes ||  || Lore Maes (born 2008) is the goddaughter of Jeroen Maes, friend of the Belgian discoverers Thierry Pauwels and Peter De Cat || 
|}

276701–276800 

|-id=781
| 276781 Montchaibeux ||  || Montchaibeux, a small hill in the Jura Mountains of Switzerland || 
|}

276801–276900 

|-bgcolor=#f2f2f2
| colspan=4 align=center | 
|}

276901–277000 

|-id=975
| 276975 Heller ||  || László Heller (1907–1980), a Hungarian professor and mechanical engineer, known for the co-invention of the Heller–Forgó system || 
|}

References 

276001-277000